The International Rugby League (IRL) was founded in its current form in 1998, consisting of 10 full members. The federation currently consists of 35 members (19 full and 16 affiliate), and 24 observer members.

Members

Full

Affiliate

Observers

See also

 Geography of rugby league

References

 
Rugby league-related lists
Lists of rugby league clubs